Rehe is an Ortsgemeinde – a community belonging to a Verbandsgemeinde – in the Westerwaldkreis in Rhineland-Palatinate, Germany.

Geography

The community lies in the Westerwald between Siegen and Limburg. Within the municipal area is found the Krombach Reservoir, which is also split by the border to the county of Lahn-Dill Kreis of Hesse. Rehe belongs to the Verbandsgemeinde of Rennerod, a kind of collective municipality. Its seat is in the like-named town.
Right at the outer North-East of the Village crosses the border of the German federal state of Hesse.

History
About 1300, Rehe had its first documentary mention. The heritage of the name Rehe is relatively unknown, but it's being said that the first family to settle down in the area had the name Reeh. Another possible explanation is, that the name references to the big population of deers (in German Reh(e)) around the area. 
Yet another explanation lays in the name of the little river flowing across the area, called Rehbach

Politics

The municipal council is made up of 12 council members who were elected in a majority vote in a municipal election on 13 June 2004.

Economy and infrastructure

Transport
Running right through the community is Bundesstraße 255, leading from Montabaur to Herborn. The nearest Autobahn interchange is Herborn on the A 45 (Dortmund–Hanau), some 14 km away. The nearest InterCityExpress stop is the railway station at Montabaur on the Cologne-Frankfurt high-speed rail line.

Tourism
Despite its size, Rehe has quite a few touristic attractions. On the one hand, there is the so-called Café Windlück, a farmer's building built in the traditional way of the Westerwald as a timbered house with way down-reaching roof on the weather side, which was built in the late Middle Ages around the year 1600. It now houses a small cafè decorated in the rural style of Westerwald.

The town hall of Rehe also is an old traditional former school-building of the 1700s which is also built as timbered house but with ornate carvings around the outer walls.

At the northwest corner of the village lays the Christliches Erholungsheim Westerwald ("Christian retreat house in Westerwald") which is a Christian embossed guesthouse in the secluded forest which offers many family vacations and youth camps.

References

External links
Rehe in the collective municipality’s Web pages 

Municipalities in Rhineland-Palatinate
Westerwaldkreis